Adagoor (Gubbi)  is a village in the southern state of Karnataka, India. It is located in the Gubbi taluk of Tumkur district.

See also
 Tumkur
 Districts of Karnataka

References

External links

Villages in Tumkur district